Moshe Carmeli (1933–2007) was the Albert Einstein Professor of Theoretical Physics, Ben Gurion University (BGU), Beer Sheva, Israel and President of the Israel Physical Society.  He received his D.Sc. from the Technion-Israel Institute of Technology in 1964.  He became the first full professor at BGU's new Department of Physics.  He did significant theoretical work in the fields of cosmology, astrophysics, general and special relativity, gauge theory, and mathematical physics, authoring 4 books, co-authoring 4 others, and publishing 128 refereed research papers in various journals and forums, plus assorted other publications (146 in all).  He is most notable for his work on gauge theory and his development of the theory of cosmological general relativity, which extends Albert Einstein's theory of general relativity from a four-dimensional spacetime to a five-dimensional space-velocity framework.

Biography 

Carmeli was born in Baghdad, Iraq in 1933.  However, he spent the majority of his life and career in Israel and the United States of America.  In 1960, he received his Masters of Science from The Hebrew University of Jerusalem under the supervision of N. Zeldes. In 1964, he received his Doctor of Science from the Technion-Israel Institute of Technology in Haifa, Israel under the supervision of Nathan Rosen.

After completion of his degree, he moved to the United States, where he stayed until 1972.  From 1964 until 1967, he worked at Temple University and later at the University of Maryland, where he was an Assistant Professor.  In 1967 he became a researcher (and later senior researcher) at the Aerospace Research Laboratory in Dayton, Ohio.  He was twice recognized for outstanding work by the United States Air Force.

In 1972, Carmeli then returned to Israel as an Associate Professor of Physics at Ben-Gurion University in the newly established Physics Department.  In 1974, he was elevated to full professor, making him the first full professor in the Physics Department.  During this period, from 1973 to 1977, he also served as the department's chairman.

In 1979, he was made Albert Einstein Professor of Theoretical Physics, a title he held for the remaining 28 years of his life. The following year, he became the Director of the Center for Theoretical Physics at BGU, a position he held until 1989.  From 1979 to 1982, he was the Vice President of the Israel Physical Society, and then became the President of the Society through 1985.

Carmeli remained active in research in theoretical physics, as well as becoming involved in science on the world stage.  He was a member of many scientific societies, including the American Physical Society, American Association for the Advancement of Science, and The New York Academy of Sciences, and was listed in both Who's Who in the World and Who's Who in Science and Technology.  He actively refereed and reviewed hundreds of scientific works by noted scientists seeking publication in over a dozen scientific journals.  He held visiting professorships at the C. N. Yang Institute of Theoretical Physics of the State University of New York at Stony Brook, the University of Maryland, the International Center for Theoretical Physics in Trieste, the Max Planck Institute for Astrophysics in Munich, the University of Massachusetts, Colgate University, Queen Mary College of the University of London, and the State University of Campinas in Brazil.  He was invited four times by the Swedish Royal Academy of Sciences to nominate candidates for the Nobel Prize in Physics.  He was also invited four times by the Wolf Foundation to nominate candidates for the Wolf Prize in Physics.

Carmeli died in 2007 in Beer-Sheva, Israel.

Cosmological general relativity 
In the 1990s, Carmeli developed a new cosmological theory called cosmological general relativity. He took Einstein's theory of general relativity and extended it into five dimensions, adding the radial velocity of galaxies expanding in the Hubble flow as the fifth dimension. This fifth dimension is known as space-velocity. He published his initial special relativistic version of the theory in 1997 in his book Cosmological Special Relativity: The Large-Scale Structure of Space, Time, and Velocity.  He then developed the complete general relativistic theory called cosmological general relativity, publishing several papers on its implications over the next decade.

Research interests 

 Cosmology
 Astrophysics
 General relativity
 Special relativity
 Gauge theory
 Mathematical physics
 Statistical physics
 Nuclear physics

Notable publications

Books

Most cited research papers 

 Complete lists of Carmeli's works can be found at Microsoft Academic Search (with links), or at his publications page at Ben Gurion University (text only).

References 

1933 births
2007 deaths
Israeli physicists
Iraqi Jews
Cosmologists
Academic staff of Ben-Gurion University of the Negev
Jewish physicists
Fellows of the American Physical Society